The following is a discography of production by Large Professor, an American hip hop musician, record producer, and DJ. He is a former member of hip hop group Main Source; all songs credited as "produced by Main Source" are also listed.

1989

Main Source – Think (VLS) 
 A1. "Think"
 B1. "Atom"

1990

Eric B. & Rakim – Let the Rhythm Hit 'Em 
(Uncredited)
 02. "No Omega" (drum programming)
 03. "In the Ghetto"
 04. "Step Back"

Intelligent Hoodlum – Intelligent Hoodlum 
 03. "Trag Invasion" (produced by Marley Marl, co-produced by Large Professor)
 07. "Game Type" (produced by Marley Marl, co-produced by Joe Burgos & Large Professor)

Kool G Rap & DJ Polo – Erase Racism (VLS) 
 B1. "Wanted: Dead or Alive (Remix)" (produced by Kool G Rap, Large Professor & Dr. Butcher)

Kool G Rap & DJ Polo – Wanted: Dead or Alive 
(All songs produced by Eric B. and co-produced by Kool G Rap & Large Professor; the album's primary producer was Large Professor, but he was not credited as such.)
 01. "Streets of New York" (co-produced by Anton Pukshansky)
 02. "Wanted: Dead or Alive"
 03. "Money in the Bank" (featuring Large Professor, Freddie Foxxx & Ant Live)
 04. "Bad to the Bone"
 05. "Talk Like Sex"
 06. "Play It Again, Polo"
 08. "Kool Is Back"
 09. "Play It Kool"
 10. "Death Wish"

Lord Finesse & DJ Mike Smooth – Strictly for the Ladies (VLS) 
 B1. "Keep It Flowing (Large Professor Remix)" (featuring A.G.) (released in 2019)

1991

Big L – Rare Selections EP Vol. 1 
 A1. "Unexpected Flava" (co-produced by Lord Finesse) (released in 2005)

The Don – Wake Up the Party 
 02. "On Tour"
 10. "Step Aside"

The Jaz – Ya Don't Stop 
 02. "Hypocritters"
 05. "It's Your Nature"

Kid 'n Play – Slippin (VLS) 
 A1. "Slippin' (Large Professor's Hard Remix)"
 B1. "Slippin' (Large Professor's Vocal Mix)"

Kool G Rap & DJ Polo – Bad to the Bone (VLS) 
 A1. "Bad to the Bone (Street Remix)" (produced by Kool G Rap & Large Professor)

Main Source – Breaking Atoms 
 01. "Snake Eyes"	
 02. "Just Hangin' Out"	
 03. "Looking at the Front Door"
 04. "Large Professor"	
 05. "Just a Friendly Game of Baseball"	
 06. "Scratch & Kut"	
 07. "Peace Is Not the Word to Play"
 08. "Vamos a Rapiar" (co-produced by Pete Rock)
 09. "He Got So Much Soul (He Don't Need No Music)"
 10. "Live at the Barbeque" (featuring Nas, Joe Fatal & Akinyele)
 11. "Watch Roger Do His Thing"	
 12. "Just a Friendly Game of Baseball (Remix)" (bonus track)

Main Source – Just Hangin' Out (VLS) 
 A2. "Just Hangin' Out (Your Hood – Remix)" (produced by Large Professor & Anton Pukshansky)

Main Source – Peace Is Not the Word to Play (VLS) 
 A1. "Peace Is Not the Word to Play (Remix)" (produced by Large Professor & Anton Pukshansky)

Nikki D – Daddy's Little Girl 
 08. "Your Man Is My Man" (produced by Smooth Ice, additional production by Large Professor & Chris Champion)

Powerule – Volume 1 
 15. "Gots ta Get This" (produced by Large Professor & Powerule)

Slick Rick – It's a Boy (VLS) 
 B1. "It's a Boy (Remix)"

1992

The Brand New Heavies – Bonafied Funk (VLS) 
 A1. "Bonafied Funk (Main Source Mix)" (featuring Main Source)

Diamond D – Stunts, Blunts and Hip Hop 
 18. "Freestyle (Yo, That's That Shit)" (produced by Diamond D, co-produced by Large Professor)

Gang Starr – Gotta Get Over (Taking Loot) (VLS) 
 A2. "Gotta Get Over (Taking Loot) (Remix)"

Pete Rock & CL Smooth – Mecca and the Soul Brother 
 05. "Act Like You Know" (produced by Pete Rock & CL Smooth, co-produced by Large Professor)

Roxanne Shante – The Bitch Is Back 
 02. "Deadly Rhymes" (featuring Kool G Rap) (produced by Kool G Rap & Large Professor)
 10. "Brothers Ain't Shit" (produced by Kool G Rap & Large Professor)

Roxanne Shante – Straight Razor (VLS) 
 B1. "Straight Razor (Large Professor Remix)"

Various artists – White Men Can't Rap 
 03. "Fakin' the Funk" (performed by Main Source)

Young Disciples – Apparently Nothin' (VLS) 
 A1. "Apparently Nothin' (Large Professor Rap Mix)" (featuring Large Professor)

1993

Akinyele – Vagina Diner 
 01. "Worldwide"	
 02. "Outta State"	
 03. "Ak Ha Ha! Ak Hoo Hoo?"	
 04. "Dear Diary"	
 05. "Bags Packed"	
 06. "The Bomb"	
 07. "Beat"	
 08. "Checkmate"	
 09. "I Luh Hur"	
 10. "You Know My Style"	
 11. "Exercise"	
 12. "No Exit"	
 13. "30 Days"

Apache – Apache Ain't Shit 
 07. "Hey Girl" (featuring Milo & Collie Weed)

Big Daddy Kane – Looks Like a Job For... 
 11. "Niggaz Never Learn"

Leaders of the New School – What's Next (VLS) 
 A2. "What's Next (Remix)"

MC Shan – Pee-Nile Reunion (VLS) 
 A2. "Pee-Nile Reunion (Dirty Version)" (featuring Neek the Exotic, Diesel, Kool G Rap & Snow) (produced by Kool G Rap & Large Professor)

Mobb Deep – Juvenile Hell 
 12. "Peer Pressure (The Large Professor Mix)"

Sample This! – Another Lie (VLS) 
 A2. "Another Lie (Large Professor Remix)"

A Tribe Called Quest – Midnight Marauders 
 11. "Keep It Rollin'" (featuring Large Professor)

1994

Beastie Boys – Sure Shot (VLS) 
 B1. "Sure Shot (Large Professor Remix)"

Nas – Illmatic 
 05. "Halftime" 
 08. "One Time 4 Your Mind"
 10. "It Ain't Hard to Tell"

Nas – It Ain't Hard to Tell Remix (VLS) 
 A1. "It Ain't Hard to Tell (Remix)"

Organized Konfusion – Stress (VLS) 
 B2. "Stress (Remix)" (featuring Large Professor)

Various artists – Wild Pitch Classics 
 09. "How My Man Went Down in the Game" (performed by Main Source) (demo, recorded in 1992)

1995

Akinyele – Break a Bitch Neck (VLS) 
 A1. "Break a Bitch Neck" (featuring Kool G Rap)

Common Sense – Resurrection (VLS) 
 A2. "Resurrection (Extra P. Remix)"
 A3. "Resurrection (Large Professor Remix)"

Mad Skillz – The Nod Factor (VLS) 
 B2. "Skillz in '95 (Dirty Mix)"

Nas – N/A 
 00. "Understanding" (featuring AZ & Biz Markie)

Tragedy Khadafi – Pass da Tek Remix (VLS) 
 A1. "Pass da Tek (Remix)" 
 B1. "Da Funk Mode (Remix)" (featuring Havoc)

1996

Akinyele – N/A 
 00. "In the World (Large Professor Remix)"

Large Professor – I Juswannachill (VLS) 
 B4. "The Mad Scientist (Remix)"

Large Professor – The LP 
(Originally completed in 1996, the album was shelved by Geffen Records. It was officially released in 2009; tracks 14 to 18 were recorded that year.)
 01. "Intro"	
 02. "That Bullshit"	
 03. "Hungry"	
 04. "I Juswannachill"
 05. "Funky 2 Listen 2"	
 06. "The Mad Scientist"	
 07. "Hard"	
 08. "One Plus One" (featuring Nas)	
 09. "The LP"	
 10. "Dancin' Girl"	
 12. "Havin' Fun"	
 14. "Amaman"	
 15. "Queens Lounge"	
 16. "Bowne"	
 17. "Big Willie"	
 18. "Outro"

Large Professor – The Mad Scientist (VLS) 
 B3. "Listen (Blast Off)"

Mad Skillz – From Where??? 
 08. "Extra Abstract Skillz" (featuring Large Professor & Q-Tip)

Various artists – High School High: The Soundtrack 
 07. "The Rap World" (performed and produced by Large Professor & Pete Rock)

Various artists – The New Groove: The Blue Note Remix Project 
 02. "Hummin' (Large Professor Remix)" (performed by Cannonball Adderley)

1997

B-1 – Hands of Time (VLS) 
 A1. "Hands of Time" (released in 2013)

1998

Lord the Arkitec – Listen Closely (Worldwide Pt. II) (VLS) 
 B2. "Name of the Game (Friends) (Street Mix)"

Various artists – The Flip Squad Allstar DJs 
 06. "It's da Biz" (performed by Biz Markie & Kia Jeffries)

1999

Akinyele – Aktapuss 
 05. "Coochie"	
 17. "Rather Fuck You"

Chris Lowe & Large Professor – CT to Queens (VLS) 
 A1. "CT to Queens (Uncut Action) (Dirty)" (produced by Large Professor & Chris Lowe)

Neek the Exotic – Make That Money (VLS) 
 B2. "Real Hip Hop"

Neek the Exotic – Turn It Out (VLS) 
 A1. "Turn It Out (Main)" (featuring Fortune)
 B1. "Money, Thugs (Main)" (featuring Royal Flush)

Nine Yards – Matter of Time (VLS) 
 A2. "Matter of Time (Large Professor Remix)"

Rob Swift – Dope on Plastic (VLS) 
 A1. "Dope on Plastic (Large Professor Remix)"

Street Smartz & Large Professor – Bottom Line: The Soundtrack, Vol. 1 
 A1. "Yo, Yo (Dirty)"

Various artists – Wild Wild West: Music Inspired by the Motion Picture 
 12. "I Sparkle" (performed by Slick Rick)

2000

Busta Rhymes – Anarchy 
 12. "The Heist" (featuring Ghostface Killah, Raekwon & Roc Marciano)

The Dwellas – The Last Shall Be First 
 03. "The Last Shall Be First" (featuring Large Professor)

Large Professor – Blaze Rhymez (VLS) 
 A1. "Blaze Rhymez (Main)"

Large Professor – Bout That Time (VLS) 
 B2. "LiveGuy Saga (Dirty)"

2001

Canibus – Rip the Jacker (VLS) 
 A3. "Canibustible"

I.G.T. – Street Music: The Preview 
 10. "Word to Life" (featuring Horace Brown)

Nas – Got Ur Self a Gun (VLS) 
 A2. "Black Zombie (Explicit)"

Nas – Stillmatic 
 05. "You're da Man"
 06. "Rewind"

Qwazmodoe – Find Out (VLS) 
 A1. "Find Out (Main)"

The U.N. – World Domination: The Mixtape 
 11. "What They Want"

2002

The Beatnuts – The Originators 
 07. "Originate" (featuring Large Professor)

Cormega – The True Meaning 
 09. "The Come Up" (featuring Large Professor)

Large Professor – 1st Class 
 01. "Intro"
 02. "'Bout That Time"
 03. "Ultimate"
 04. "Brand New"
 05. "Stay Chisel" (featuring Nas)
 06. "Akinyele (Live at the BBQ, Pt. 2)" (featuring Akinyele)
 08. "Born to Ball"
 10. "The Man"
 11. "Large Pro"
 13. "Blaze Rhymez II"
 14. "On" (featuring Busta Rhymes)
 15. "Hip Hop"
 16. "Radioactive"
 17. "Back to Back" (bonus track)

Non Phixion – The Future Is Now 
 02. "Drug Music"
 12. "It's Us"
 15. "We Are the Future"

Rob Swift – Sound Event 
 04. "Hip Hop on Wax" (featuring Large Professor) (produced by Rob Swift, co-produced by Large Professor)

Various artists – The Anti-Backpack Movement 
 06. "151 Excuses" (performed by 151 Proof)

The X-Ecutioners – Built from Scratch 
 02. "XL" (featuring Large Professor)

2003

Craig G – This Is Now!!! 
 11. "Love Is Love" (featuring Large Professor)

Lord Finesse – From the Crates to the Files ...The Lost Sessions 
 04. "Isn't He Something (Extra P Session Mix)"

Mic Geronimo – Long Road Back 
 15. "Up Now"

Neek the Exotic – Exotic's Raw 
 03. "Prepared to Get Stomped"	
 04. "Make That Money" (featuring Royal Flush)
 05. "Don't Stop"
 06. "Exotic's Raw" (featuring Large Professor)
 07. "Backs 'n' Necks"
 10. "Hardcore" (featuring Large Professor)
 13. "The Mothafuckin Man" (featuring Joe Flav)
 14. "This Here's Gangsta" (featuring Royal Flush & Universal)

2004

Akinyele – Live at the Barbecue: Unreleased Hit's 
 02. "Murder"

Gore-Tex – Reload 
 02. "Pyramid"

Mr. Complex – Twisted Mister 
 15. "No Turning Back" (featuring Tia Thomas)

Nas – 10 Year Anniversary Illmatic Platinum Series 
 2-06. "Star Wars"

Rah Digga – Everything Is a Story (unreleased) 
 17. "I Need a Shorty" (co-produced by Shea Taylor)

2005

Large Professor – The Beginning (VLS) 
 A1. "The Beginning (Hood)"
 B1. "After School (Hood)"

Large Professor – Secret Design (VLS) 
 A1. "Secret Design"
 B1. "Decisions"

Lord Finesse & DJ Mike Smooth – Here I Come Remix (VLS) 
 A1. "Here I Come (Remix) (Main)"

2006

The Black Eyed Peas – Renegotiations: The Remixes 
 07. "Disco Club (Large Pro Peas Remix)"

Boot Camp Clik – The Last Stand 
 13. "World Wide"

Large Professor – N/A 
 00. "Rapid Fire"

Prince Po – Prettyblack 
 05. "Right 2 Know" (featuring Chas West)

Various artists – Re-Bop: The Savoy Remixes 
 05. "Minority (Large Professor's Tjaz Remix)" (performed by Cal Tjader)

2007

Big Pun – In Memory Of... Volume One 
 10. "Tres Leches (Remix)" (featuring Prodigy & Inspectah Deck)

Grand Daddy I.U. – Stick to the Script 
 09. "Mack of the Year"

Jurassic 5 – N/A 
 00. "Hood in the USA"

Killa Sha – God Walk on Water 
 05. "Unbroken"
 13. "Come On"

Mic Geronimo – Alive 
 14. "Nic Nac" (featuring Darcyde)

Styles P – The Ghost Sessions 
 08. "The Struggle"

Thisish – Thisish, Vol. 1 
 10. "Large Professor Got Heat!!!"

Various artists – Free Speech: The Mixtape 
 09. "Do Que Somos Capaz" (performed by Black Mastah & Bob da Rage Sense) (produced by Large Professor & Bomberjack)

2008

AZ – Undeniable 
 12. "The Hardest" (featuring Styles P)

Genocide – The Psy-Op Mixtape 
 04. "Epitome of Illness" (featuring Dave Lad, Emir KA & Orakle)

L.E.O. – Spiritual Intelligence 
 01. "So Glorious"
 02. "King Leopold"
 03. "Omnipotence"
 04. "The Perfect Line"
 05. "Right to Live" (featuring B.C.)
 06. "No Sleep"
 07. "Panic Button"
 08. "Trainspotting"
 09. "Mother of God"
 10. "Triple 7" (featuring Billy Mage, Creyesis, Spit-Acular, Espionage, I-Dub & Scott Bluntz)
 11. "Windows"

Large Professor – Main Source 
 01. "The Entrance"	
 02. "Hot: Sizzling, Scorching, Torching, Blazing"	
 03. "'Maica Livin'" (featuring Guardian Leep & Killa Sha)
 04. "Pump Ya Fist" (featuring Mikey D & Lotto)
 05. "Party Time"	
 06. "In the Ghetto"	
 08. "Frantic Barz"	
 09. "Sewin' Love"	
 10. "RuDopeDapnNoyd Pt. 1" (featuring Jeru the Damaja)
 11. "RuDopeDapnNoyd Pt. 2" (featuring Lil' Dap)
 12. "RuDopeDapnNoyd Pt. 3" (featuring Big Noyd)
 13. "Classic Emergency"	
 14. "Rockin' Hip Hop"	
 15. "Large Pro Says"	
 16. "To the Meadows"

Lil' Dap – I.A. Dap 
 09. "In My Life Time"

Presto – State of the Art 
 17. "Conquer Mentally (Large Pro Remix)" (featuring Large Professor, O.C. & Sadat X)

Reks – Grey Hairs 
 05. "Stages"

Termanology – Politics as Usual 
 11. "Sorry I Lied to You"

2009

Cormega – Born and Raised 
 08. "Journey"

Earatik Statik – The Good, the Bad and the Ugly 
 15. "No Problems (Extra P Remix)"

Grand Puba – Retroactive 
 06. "Same Old Drama" (featuring Large Professor)

Krumb Snatcha – Hidden Scriptures 
 11. "Mind Power"
 14. "Heaven on Earth" (featuring Lauren)

Señor Kaos – Walk Softly and Carry a Big Brick 
 16. "Slick Money" (featuring P.So)

Termanology – Time Machine: Hood Politics VI 
 04. "Time Machine" (featuring Reks)

U-God – Dopium 
 11. "New Classic" (featuring Large Professor)

2010

Cold Heat – Life Behind Bars 
 14. "Why You Wanna Do That" (featuring Craig G, Large Professor & Sean Price)

Killa Sha – Acknowledge the Vet 
 02. "Never Gonna Stop Me"

Neek the Exotic & Large Professor – Exotic Species 
 01. "Guess Who" 
 02. "Toast Tonight" (featuring Fortune & Satchel Page)
 03. "Still on the Hustle" 
 07. "You Make My Head Swing (Extra P Remix)"
 08. "We All About" (featuring Royal Flush)
 09. "Turn It Out" (featuring Fortune)

Planet Asia & Gold Chain Military – Chain of Command 
 17. "Organic Food"

Rhymefest – Dangerous: 5-18 
 07. "Bad Self" (featuring Rahzel)

2011

Funkoars – The Quickening 
 02. "The Quickening"

J-Love – Egotistical Maniac 
 1-20. "I'm Not the One"

Joell Ortiz – Free Agent 
 12. "Oh!" (featuring Iffy)

Large Professor – Key to the City (VLS) 
 B1. "Key to the City (Mad Scientist Remix)"

Neek the Exotic & Large Professor – Still on the Hustle 
 01. "Still on the Hustle"
 03. "Guess Who" (featuring Large Professor)
 04. "Street Rebel" (featuring Joell Ortiz)
 09. "Head Spin"
 10. "Personal Freak"
 11. "Toast Tonite" (featuring Fortune, Large Professor and Stachel Page)

Torae – For the Record 
 07. "Do the Math"

2012

Large Professor – Professor @ Large 
 01. "Key to the City"
 02. "UNOWHTMSAYN"
 03. "Straight from the Golden" (featuring Busta Rhymes) 
 04. "Focused Up" (featuring Cormega & Tragedy Khadafi)
 05. "Happy Days R Here" (featuring Lil' Fame)
 07. "Light Years" 
 08. "Barber Shop Chop (Instrolude)"
 09. "Live Again" 
 10. "Mack Don Illz" (featuring Mic Geronimo & Grand Daddy I.U.)
 11. "Sun, Star & Crescents (Instrolude)"
 12. "Kick da Habit"
 13. "LP Surprise"
 14. "Back in Time (Instrolude)"
 15. "M.A.R.S." (featuring Cormega, Action Bronson, Roc Marciano & Saigon)

Pete Flux – Mood Swings  
 05. "Large Is a Good Guy"

Public Enemy – Most of My Heroes Still Don't Appear on No Stamp 
 07. "Catch the Thrown" (featuring Cormega & Large Professor)

2013

Ill Bill – The Grimy Awards 
 10. "Acid Reflux"
 16. "Canarsie High"

J-Love – Not Designed to Quit 
 18. "Firenado" (featuring AG da Coroner, Prince Original & Take-It)

Mayer Hawthorne – Her Favorite Song (VLS) 
 A2. "Her Favorite Song (Large Professor Remix)"

N.O.R.E. – Student of the Game 
 16. "Built Pyramids" (featuring Large Professor)

2014

Cormega – Mega Philosophy 
 01. "A New Day Begins"
 02. "MARS (The Dream Team)" (featuring AZ, Redman & Styles P)
 03. "Industry"
 04. "More" (featuring Chantelle Nandi)
 05. "Reflection"
 06. "D.U. (Divine Unity)" (featuring Nature)
 07. "Honorable" (featuring Raekwon)
 08. "Rap Basquiat"
 09. "Rise" (featuring Maya Azucena)
 10. "Home" (featuring Black Rob)
 11. "Valuable Lessons" (featuring Jarell Perry)

Halfcut – From Dungeons to Rooftops 
 05. "Last Call"

Illa Ghee – Social Graffiti 
 15. "90"

Jeru the Damaja – The Hammer 
 06. "Solar Flares"

Various artists – Stashed in Fortress Volume 16 
 28. "Kiss the Sky (Large Professor Remix)" (performed by Blu)

2015

Capone-N-Noreaga – Lessons 
 13. "Pizza"

Diamond District – March on Washington Redux 
 04. "Working Weekends"

Large Professor – Re:Living 
 01. "Re:Living"
 02. "Dreams Don't Die"
 03. "Opulence"
 04. "Earn"
 05. "Off Yo Azz on Yo Feet" 
 06. "In the Scrolls" (featuring G-Wiz)
 07. "Own World" (featuring Fortune)
 08. "Sophia Yo"
 09. "New Train Ole Route" (produced by J-Love, co-produced by Large Professor)
 10. "Industry RMX 2" (featuring Inspectah Deck, Cormega, Roc Marciano, Sadat X & Lord Jamar)
 11. "NDN"

2016

Homeboy Sandman – Kindness for Weakness 
 05. "It's Cold" (featuring Steve Arrington)

Meyhem Lauren – Piatto D'oro 
 07. "Not Guilty"

Reks – The Greatest X 
 09. "Gone Baby Gone"

Southpaw Chop – Here We Go (VLS) 
 A1. "Here We Go (Remix)" (featuring Large Professor)

Timeless Truth – Cold Wave 
 09. "Wavelength"

Various artists – The Underworld 2 
 17. "Legacy" (performed by Ill Bill, Sean Strange & Salome)

2017

DJ Koss – Born to Live 
 15. "This Is Now (Large Professor Remix)" (featuring Keith Murray)

M-Dot – Ego and the Enemy 
 07. "The Empathy"

Powerule – The Anomaly: Reloaded 
 02. "Glorify n Praise" (featuring Large Professor)
 10. "American Horror Story"

2018

Son of Sam – Come a Long Way (VLS) 
 B1. "Come a Long Way (The Extra P Remix)" (featuring Large Professor & Masta Ace)

U-God – Venom 
 08. "Felon"

2019

Truth – The Fight for Survival 
 14. "TNT (Remix)" (featuring Tragedy Khadafi)

2020

The Lox – Living Off Xperience 
 09. "Think of the LOX" (featuring Westside Gunn & Benny the Butcher)

2021

Al Skratch – N/A 
 00. "Be Original"

Papoose – April 
 02. "Represent"

Papoose – September 
 03. "Cold Winter"

References

External links
Large Professor credits at Discogs

 
Discographies of American artists
Hip hop discographies
Production discographies